The Saint-Hyacinthe station is a Via Rail station in Saint-Hyacinthe, Quebec, Canada.
The station is staffed and is wheelchair-accessible. Several corridor Montreal-Quebec City trains and the long-distance Ocean stop here; the Montreal–Gaspé train was suspended in 2013. The station's business hours are from 7:00 am to 11:15 am (for morning travellers) and from 6:00 pm to 8:30 pm (for evening travelers); seven days a week. A bicycle box and a baggage room are special amenities found in this station.

The rail station is completely accessible by public transportation.

External links

Via Rail page for the Ocean
Via Rail page for the Montreal – Gaspé train

Notes

References 

Via Rail stations in Quebec
Transport in Saint-Hyacinthe
Buildings and structures in Saint-Hyacinthe